Statistics of the Primera División de México for the 1963–64 season.

Overview

Zacatepec was promoted to Primera División.

The season was contested by 14 teams, and Guadalajara won the championship.

No Relegation this season.

Promotional tournament was held to increase the number of teams for the 1964–65 season to 16. Nacional finished in first place, and was not to be relegated from the Primera Division. Veracruz finished in second place, and was promoted to Primera Division.

Teams

League standings

Results

Promotion tournament 

In order to increase the number of team from 14 to 16 for the 1964-65 the league made a playoff. The top 2 teams would be in Primera Division. The playoff was composed of the lowest team from Primera division and the 2nd-5th teams in the standings from Segunda Division as Cruz Azul had earned automatic promotion. The playoff was played between January 16 and February 6 1964. All games were played in Estadio Olímpico Universitario, Mexico City.

Results

References

Mexico - List of final tables (RSSSF)

1963-64
Mex
1963–64 in Mexican football